Monkey god  may refer to:

 Hanuman, a Hindu deity, also a character in Ramayana Epic
 Sun Wukong (also known as The Monkey King), a Taoist deity, a Buddhist deity, and a character in the classical Chinese epic Journey to the West
  of Japan, often depicted as evil deities, as in the tales of Shippeitaro
 Howler monkey gods, a patron of the artisans among the Classic Mayas
 La Ciudad Blanca, sometimes referred to as a "City of the Monkey God"
 Babi, or Baba, Egyptian deity of Baboons